Changte Lalremsaga (born 28 December 1973) is an Indian archer. He competed at the 1992 Summer Olympics and the 1996 Summer Olympics.

References

1973 births
Living people
Indian male archers
Olympic archers of India
Archers at the 1992 Summer Olympics
Archers at the 1996 Summer Olympics
Place of birth missing (living people)